Luninets District is an administrative subdivision, a raion of Brest Region, in Belarus. The district seat is Luninets.

Demographics
At the time of the Belarus Census (2009), Luninets District had a population of 73,200. Of these, 96.2% were of Belarusian, 2.5% Russian and 0.8% Ukrainian ethnicity. 76.8% spoke Belarusian and 21.9% Russian as their native language.

Notable residents 

 Anton Sokał-Kutyłoŭski (1892 (Pieravaloki-Darahišča (renamed Čyrvonaja Horka)) - 1983), active participant in the Belarusian independence movement, a military leader of anti-Soviet resistance in the early 20th century and a Gulag prisoner.

 Sviatlana Tsikhanouskaya (b.1982, Mikashevichy), Belarusian human rights activist and politician

References

 
Districts of Brest Region